Melitopol Railway station is a railway station in the Ukrainian city Melitopol of Zaporizhzhia Oblast currently under Russian occupation.

History
The station opened in 1874, simultaneously with the opening of the railway. The Aleksandrovsk – Melitopol line came into operation on 28 June and the Melitopol – Simferopol line in October 1874.

During the Russian civil war one of the buildings of the station was used as the headquarters of the commander of the Southern front Mikhail Frunze.

During the Eastern Front (World War II) in October 1943 the building was destroyed, and for the next 10 years, the duties of the station was performed by small kiosks, located on the site of the current trunk.

In 1955 a new building was constructed. The opening of the station was planned on 7 November to commemorate the October coup, however, the builders failed to meet the deadline, and the station was commissioned on 4 December.

The station platforms held monuments of Stalin and Lenin, the first was quickly removed however the second remained on the platform until the 1990s, and then was moved to Pryvokzalna Square and finally taken down 2015.

This station along with the entire city of Melitopol was captured and later annexed by Russia in 2022 during the invasion of Ukraine.

Trains
 Kyiv – Novooleksievka
 Kharkiv – Novooleksievka
 Dnipro – Novooleksievka

Gallery

References

External links

 Train times

Railway stations in Zaporizhzhia Oblast
Melitopol
Railway stations opened in 1874